Cassius Clay (soon Muhammad Ali) fought a ten-round boxing match with George Logan in Los Angeles on March 23, 1962. Clay won the fight through a technical knockout after the referee stopped the fight in the fourth round. This was Clay's 13th professional victory and before the fight Jack Dempsey predicted he would win the title. Logan sustained a serious eye injury during the bout that eventually led to its stoppage. Logan later claimed his cornermen told him to use low blows against Clay but he refused. Logan was later a truant officer and a police officer in his native state of Idaho.

References

Logan
1963 in boxing
April 1963 sports events in the United States